Oram is an Old Norse surname particularly found in the North of England. Notable people with this surname are:

Albert Oram, Baron Oram (1913–1999), British politician; MP from East Ham South
Andrew Oram (b. 1975), English cricketer
Chandre Oram (contemporary), Indian man who has a tail; believed by some to be an incarnation of Hanuman
Christopher Oram (contemporary), British theatre set and costume designer
Daphne Oram (1925–2003), British composer and electronic musician; creator of the "Oramics" technique
Eddie Oram (1914–2004), American basketball player
Gerard Oram (contemporary), British cultural and social historian
Jacob Oram (b. 1978), New Zealand cricketer
Jual Oram (b. 1961), Indian politician representing the Sundargarh constituency of Orissa in the Indian parliament
Kenneth Oram (1919–2001), clergyman
Matthew Oram (1885–1969), New Zealand politician, MP for Manawatu
Nick Oram (b. 1979), American television producer and actor
Neil Oram (b. 1938) British musician, poet, artist and playwright
Paul Oram (contemporary), Canadian politician from Newfoundland and Labrador
Richard Oram (contemporary), Scottish historian, professor, and author
Rod Oram (contemporary), New Zealand journalist, columnist, and radio commentator
Ruth Joy Oram, singer with Krush
Sarah Oram (1860–1946), British nurse
Steve Oram (b. 1973), English comedian, actor, writer, and musician
Tara Oram (b. 1984), Canadian singer and Canadian Idol finalist
William Oram (1711-1777),  English painter and architect
Wilma Oram (1916–2001), Australian Army nurse during World War II

See also 

ORAM (organization), UNHCR partner Organization advocating for (LGBTI) Refuge, Asylum & Migration
Oblivious RAM
Apostolides v Orams

References